The Quintuple Alliance came into being at the Congress of Aix-la-Chapelle in 1818, when France joined the Quadruple Alliance created by Austria, Prussia, Russia, and Great Britain. The European peace settlement concluded at the Congress of Vienna in 1815. 

After following the Congress of Aix-la-Chapelle (in Aachen), the Alliance powers met thrice: in 1820 at the Congress of Troppau (Opava), in 1821 at the Congress of Laibach (Ljubljana), and in 1822 at the Congress of Verona. 

While Britain stood largely aloof from the Alliance's illiberal actions, the four continental monarchies were successful in authorising Austrian military action in Italy in 1821 and French intervention in Spain in 1823.

The Alliance is conventionally taken to have become defunct along with the Holy Alliance of the three original continental members following the death of Emperor Alexander I of Russia in 1825. Despite the Alliance's dissolution, the Great Powers of France, Britain, and Russia would go on to intervene in the Battle of Navarino.

See also
Concert of Europe

Notes

Further reading
 Nichols, Irby Coghill. The European Pentarchy and the Congress of Verona, 1822 (Springer Science & Business Media, 2012).

Late modern Europe
19th-century military alliances
1818 treaties
Military alliances involving the United Kingdom
Military alliances involving Austria
Military alliances involving France
Military alliances involving Prussia
Military alliances involving Russia
1818 in France
1818 in the United Kingdom
Austrian Empire
19th century in Prussia
19th century in the Russian Empire
Treaties of the Kingdom of Prussia
Treaties of the Bourbon Restoration
Treaties of the Austrian Empire
Treaties of the United Kingdom (1801–1922)
Treaties of the Russian Empire